The Judo at the 2022 Asian Games competitions were to be held in Hangzhou, People's Republic of China, from 11 to 14 September 2022. The games were postponed for a date yet to be determined.

References

External links
 

 
2022 Asian Games events
2022
Asia
Asian Games
Asian Games
Judo